Treasure Hunt is a 1952 British comedy film directed by John Paddy Carstairs and starring Martita Hunt, Jimmy Edwards, Naunton Wayne and Athene Seyler. It is based on the 1949 play Treasure Hunt by M.J. Farrell and John Perry.

It was shot at Teddington Studios in London, which had been for many years the base of the British subsidiary of Warner Brothers. It was the last film to be shot there, before it was later taken over as a television production facility. The film's sets were designed by the art director John Howell.

Plot
On his death, the eccentric family of rakish Sir Roderick Lyall (Jimmy Edwards) gathers at his ancestral Irish mansion, Ballyroden Hall, for the reading of the will. Everyone is shocked to hear that, once debts are paid, the only asset remaining will be the mansion. The family doctor, Mr. Walsh (Miles Malleson), suggests the mansion be turned into a guest house to bring in funds. Half the family supports the idea, but Uncle Hercules (Jimmy Edwards) and Consuelo (Athene Seyler) endeavour to sabotage the scheme. All the while, Aunt Anna Rose (Martita Hunt) insists she has mislaid a fortune in jewels – but her story is doubted due to her eccentric personality. When the first paying guests, Eustace Mills (Naunton Wayne), Mrs. Cleghorn-Thomas (June Clyde) and daughter Yvonne (Mara Lane), arrive for their holiday, expecting peace and quiet, they find themselves caught up in a series of farcical situations caused by their hosts.

Cast

 Martita Hunt as Aunt Anna Rose
 Jimmy Edwards as Hercules Ryall / Sir Roderick Ryall
 Naunton Wayne as Eustace Mills
 Athene Seyler as Consuelo Howard
 June Clyde as Mrs. Cleghorn-Thomas
 Miles Malleson as Mr Walsh
 Susan Stephen as Mary O'Leary
 Brian Worth as Philip
 Mara Lane as Yvonne
 Maire O'Neill as Brigid
 Toke Townley as William Burke
 Bee Duffell as Mrs. Guidera	
 Joseph Tomelty as Poacher	
 John McDarby as Taxi Driver	
 Tony Quinn as Dan Brady	
 Wilfred Caithness as Doctor	
 Hamlyn Benson as Butler	
 Irene Handl as Nanny	
 Shelagh Carty as 2nd Nanny	
 Kendrick Owen as Stable Boy	
 Marguerite Brennan as Pert Little Maid	
 Diana Campbell as 2nd Maid	
 John Kelly as Bookmaker	
 Kenneth Kove as Clergyman	
 Patrick O'Connor as Telegraph Boy	
 James Page as Racing Enthusiast	
 Roger Maxwell as Military-Looking Man	
 Nella Occleppo as Schoolgirl
 Michael Ripper as Removal Man	
 Fred Johnson as 2nd Removal Man
 Alfie Bass as Tipster

Critical reception
TV Guide called it "A tedious comedy"; Britmovie called it a "Minor farce"; while Sky Movies wrote, "Producer Anatole de Grunwald adapted the stage play by M J Farrell and John Perry in an enjoyably straightforward way. Director John Paddy Cartairs handles the film with appropriate vitality, making the most of the basically conventional stage Irish characters. Martita Hunt and Athene Seyler stand out in a large cast, among whom are such familiar faces as Miles Malleson, Alfie Bass and Hammer Films regular Michael Ripper."

References

External links
 

1952 films
1952 comedy films
British comedy films
Films directed by John Paddy Carstairs
Films with screenplays by Anatole de Grunwald
British black-and-white films
Films set in Ireland
Films about inheritances
British films based on plays
Films shot at Teddington Studios
1950s English-language films
1950s British films